American Scary is a 2006 American documentary film about the history and legacy of classic television horror hosts, written and directed by American independent filmmakers John E. Hudgens and Sandy Clark.

Background
The film features nearly 60 horror hosts, including interviews with and vintage clips of many of the genre's stars, such as Washington, DC's Count Gore De Vol, New York City's Zacherley, Los Angeles' Vampira, Cleveland's Ghoulardi, and Chicago's Svengoolie, among others. Non-host celebrities such as Neil Gaiman, Tim Conway, Forrest J Ackerman, Tom Savini, Leonard Maltin, Joel Hodgson, and Bob Burns appear to reminisce about the influence of horror hosts on their careers and/or lives, as well as many modern hosts who keep the tradition alive in modern shows on public-access television cable TV or the internet.

The film premiered in October 2006 at the Hollywood Film Festival, and was released on DVD in February 2009. In April 2010, it won the award for Best Independent Production of 2009 at the 8th Annual Rondo Hatton Classic Horror Awards.

See also 
Virginia Creepers

References

External links
 
 

2006 films
American documentary films
Horror hosts
Documentary films about television
2006 documentary films
Documentary films about horror
2000s English-language films
2000s American films